Wait Chapel is a building on the campus of Wake Forest University. It houses the Janet Jeffrey Carlile Harris Carillon of 48 bells. The chapel seats 2,250 people. The steeple reaches to 213 feet. It also houses the Williams Organ, donated by Walter McAdoo Williams, namesake of Walter M. Williams High School.

The first building constructed on the Reynolda campus of Wake Forest University, it was named in memory of Samuel Wait, the university's first president, in October 1956.

Dr. Martin Luther King Jr. spoke at Wait Chapel on October 11, 1962. On March 17, 1978, President Jimmy Carter made a major National Security address in Wait Chapel. In 1988, it hosted a presidential debate between George H. W. Bush and Michael Dukakis. On October 11, 2000, it hosted the presidential debate between candidates George W. Bush and Al Gore.  On September 13, 2007 it hosted a broadcast of National Public Radio (NPR) show, Wait, Wait, Don't Tell Me. The show aired on September 15. Robert F. Kennedy, Jr. spoke there in November 2011. A private memorial ceremony for Dr. Maya Angelou was held in Wait Chapel on June 7, 2014. Attendees included First Lady Michelle Obama, President Bill Clinton, and Oprah Winfrey.

The Chapel is linked to a vast underground series of tunnels crisscrossing the campus carrying utilities.

The congregation of Wake Forest Baptist Church holds regular Sunday services in the chapel.  In the late 1990s the chapel became the center of controversy when members of the church decided to conduct a same-sex commitment ceremony; this became the subject of the documentary A Union in Wait.  Other events held in the chapel throughout the year, include a Moravian lovefeast during the Christmas season.

Notes

References

 NPR's Wait, Wait, Don't Tell Me
 Winston-Salem Journal, Winston-Salem NC, 19 April 1978
 A Union In Wait

External links

 Wait Chapel fact-sheet
 Wake Forest University Chaplain - Chapel Tour
 Photo Collection - Wait, Wait, Don't Tell Me
 Wait, Wait, Don't Tell Me - Bluff the Listner
 Wake Forest Baptist Church

Bell towers in the United States
Carillons
University and college chapels in the United States
Churches in Winston-Salem, North Carolina
Baptist churches in North Carolina
Moravian churches in North Carolina
LGBT churches in the United States
Towers in North Carolina
Wake Forest University
Clock towers in North Carolina